Luis Henrique (born August 21, 1993) is a Brazilian mixed martial artist currently competing in the heavyweight division. A professional since 2011, he has also fought in the UFC and KSW.

Mixed martial arts career

Early career
Henrique began his professional MMA career in November 2011. He competed exclusively in his native Brazil for the first three-and-a-half years of his career and amassed a record of 8–1 with one No Contest over this time.

Ultimate Fighting Championship
Henrique made his promotional debut against fellow newcomer Francis Ngannou on December 19, 2015 at UFC on Fox 17. He lost the fight via knockout in the second round.

Henrique faced promotional newcomer Dmitry Smolyakov on July 23, 2016 at UFC on Fox 20. He won the fight via submission in the second round.

Henrique next faced Christian Colombo on November 19, 2016 at UFC Fight Night 100. He won the fight via submission in the third round.

Henrique faced Marcin Tybura on March 5, 2017 at UFC 209. He lost the fight via TKO in the third round.

Henrique faced promotional newcomer Arjan Bhullar on September 9, 2017 at UFC 215. He lost the fight via unanimous decision.

Henrique was expected to face Timothy Johnson at UFC Fight Night 125, but was removed from the fight card due to a bicep injury that needed surgery.

In June 2018 it was announced that Henrique would face Mark Godbeer in a light heavyweight bout on September 22, 2018 at UFC Fight Night 137. However, Godbeer pulled out of the fight in early August citing injury and was replaced by promotional newcomer Ryan Spann. He lost the fight via a unanimous decision.

It was reported on November 24, 2018 that Henrique was released by the UFC.

Post-UFC career
After the release from the UFC Henrique one submission victory in his old promotion Watch Out Combat Show before signing with the KSW. Henrique made his promotional debut against Michał Andryszak at KSW 49: Soldić vs. Kaszubowski on May 18, 2018. He won the fight via first-round submission.

Henrique made his sophomore appearance in the KSW as he replaced Damian Grabowski who withdrew from a title bout against Philip De Fries at KSW 50: London on September 14, 2019 due to a hand injury. Henrique lost the fight split decision.

After the failed title shot, Henrique was expected to face Teodoras Aukštuolis at ARES FC 2 on April 3, 2020. However, due to the COVID-19 pandemic, the event was postponed until October 30, 2020.

Henrique faced Aleksandr Maslov in the main event of Open Fighting Championship 3 on April 17, 2021. He lost a close bout via split decision.

Henrique faced Kirill Kornilov on May 6, 2022 at RCC 11. He lost the bout via unanimous decision.

Henrique faced Slim Trabelsi on June 25, 2022 at Ares FC 7. He lost the bout via unanimous decision.

Mixed martial arts record

|-
|Loss
|align=center|13–9 (1) 
|Slim Trabelsi
|Decision (unanimous)
|Ares FC 7
|
|align=center|3
|align=center|5:00
|Paris, France
|
|-
|Loss
|align=center|13–8 (1) 
|Kirill Kornilov
|Decision (unanimous)
|RCC 11
|
|align=center|3
|align=center|5:00
|Yekaterinburg, Russia
|
|-
|Loss
|align=center| 13–7 (1)
|Aleksandr Maslov
|Decision (split)
|Open Fighting Championship 3
|
|align=center|5
|align=center|5:00
|St. Petersburg, Russia
|
|-
| Win
|align=center| 13–6 (1)
|João Paulo dos Santos
|Submission (guillotine choke)
|WOCS 55
|
|align=center|1
|align=center|1:02
|Rio de Janeiro, Brazil
|
|-
| Loss
|align=center| 12–6 (1)
|Phil De Fries
|Decision (split) 
|KSW 50: London
|
|align=center|5 
|align=center|5:00 
|London, England
|
|-
|Win
|align=center| 12–5 (1)
|Michał Andryszak
|Technical Submission (guillotine choke)
| KSW 49: Soldić vs. Kaszubowski
|
|align=center|1
|align=center|1:59
|Gdańsk/Sopot, Poland
|
|-
|Win
|align=center| 11–5 (1)
|Rodolfo Oliveira
|Submission (guillotine choke)
|WOCS 53
|
|align=center|1
|align=center|1:59
|Rio de Janeiro, Brazil
|
|-
| Loss
|align=center| 10–5 (1)
|Ryan Spann
|Decision (unanimous)
|UFC Fight Night: Santos vs. Anders 
|
|align=center|3
|align=center|5:00
|São Paulo, Brazil
|
|-
| Loss
| align=center|10–4 (1)
| Arjan Bhullar
| Decision (unanimous)
| UFC 215 
| 
| align=center|3
| align=center|5:00
| Edmonton, Alberta, Canada
|
|-
| Loss
| align=center|10–3 (1)
| Marcin Tybura
| TKO (punches) 
| UFC 209
| 
| align=center|3
| align=center|3:46
| Las Vegas, Nevada, United States
|
|-
| Win
| align=center| 10–2 (1)
| Christian Colombo
| Submission (guillotine choke)
| UFC Fight Night: Bader vs. Nogueira 2
| 
| align=center| 3
| align=center| 2:12
| São Paulo, Brazil
|
|-
| Win
| align=center| 9–2 (1)
| Dmitry Smolyakov
| Submission (rear-naked choke)
| UFC on Fox: Holm vs. Shevchenko
| 
| align=center| 2
| align=center| 3:58
| Chicago, Illinois, United States
|
|-
| Loss
| align=center| 8–2 (1)
| Francis Ngannou
| KO (punch)
| UFC on Fox: dos Anjos vs. Cowboy 2
| 
| align=center| 2
| align=center| 2:53
| Orlando, Florida, United States
| 
|-
| Win
| align=center| 8–1 (1)
| Heitor Eschiavo
| Submission (americana)
| WOCS 41
| 
| align=center| 2
| align=center| 1:35
| Rio de Janeiro, Brazil
| 
|-
| Win
| align=center| 7–1 (1)
| Armando Sixel
| Decision (unanimous)
| WOCS 40
| 
| align=center| 3
| align=center| 5:00
| Rio de Janeiro, Brazil
| 
|-
| Win
| align=center| 6–1 (1)
| João Paulo Santos
| Submission (rear-naked choke)
| WOCS 38
| 
| align=center| 1
| align=center| 1:46
| Ubá, Brazil
| 
|-
| Win
| align=center| 5–1 (1)
| Danilo Souza
| Decision (unanimous)
| WOCS 35
| 
| align=center| 3
| align=center| 3:00
| Rio de Janeiro, Brazil
| 
|-
| Win
| align=center| 4–1 (1)
| Ney Duarte 
| TKO (punches)
| WOCS 22
| 
| align=center| 2
| align=center| N/A
| Rio de Janeiro, Brazil
| 
|-
| Win
| align=center| 3–1 (1)
| Túlio Marcos 
| TKO (punches)
| Brasil Fight 6: Brasil vs. USA
| 
| align=center| 1
| align=center| 1:16
| Rio de Janeiro, Brazil
| 
|-
| NC
| align=center| 2–1 (1)
| Jollyson Francino
| No Contest (illegal headbutt)
| Shooto Brazil 32
| 
| align=center| 2
| align=center| 4:19
| Rio de Janeiro, Brazil
| 
|-
| Loss
| align=center| 2–1
| Sultan Aliev
| TKO (punches)
| Revolution FC 1: Beirut
| 
| align=center| 2
| align=center| 2:30
| Beirut, Lebanon
|
|-
| Win
| align=center| 2–0
| Luis Mauricio
| TKO (punches)
| Showtime Fights 2
| 
| align=center| 1
| align=center| 4:29
| Rio de Janeiro, Brazil
|
|-
| Win
| align=center| 1–0
| Jorge Evangelista
| Decision (unanimous)
| WOCS 16
| 
| align=center| 3
| align=center| 5:00
| Rio de Janeiro, Brazil
|
|-

See also
List of male mixed martial artists

References

External links
 
 
 
 
 

1993 births
Living people
Brazilian male mixed martial artists
Sportspeople from Rio de Janeiro (city)
Heavyweight mixed martial artists
Light heavyweight mixed martial artists
Mixed martial artists utilizing Muay Thai
Mixed martial artists utilizing Brazilian jiu-jitsu
Brazilian Muay Thai practitioners
Ultimate Fighting Championship male fighters
Brazilian practitioners of Brazilian jiu-jitsu